The 2010 Melon Music Awards were held on Wednesday, December 15, 2010, at the Hall of Peace of Kyung Hee University in Seoul, South Korea. Organized by Kakao M through its online music store Melon, the 2010 ceremony was the second installment of the event. The winners for the Top 10 Bonsang Award were announced prior to the ceremony.

Performers

Presenters 
 Song Joong-ki – Official host
 Lee Soo-hyuk & Kim Jung-hwa – Top 10 Award For 2NE1, CNBLUE & DJ DOC
 Lee Ju-han & Kim Min-seo – Best Alternative Rock & Best R&B 
 Seo Kang-joo  & Moon Ji-ye – MBC Plus Artist Award & MBC Radio Artist Award
 Lee Kan & Choi Ah-ra – Top 10 Award For 4men & Girls Generation 
 Kim Gi-deuk – Album of the Year
 Han Seong-jin & Jung So-ra – Best Music Video, Best Trot & Best Rap / Hip Hop
 Park Ki-woong & Yoon Song-i – Top 10 Award For IU, 2AM & Lee Seung-gi
 Kim Jung-man – Culture Performer Award
 Julien Kang & Min Hye-kyung – Top 10 Award For T-ara & 2PM
 Choi Phillip & Kim Bin-woo – Hot Trend Award & Best OST
 Danny Ahn & Oh Se-jeong – Best Songwriter Award & Netizen Popularity Award
 Jo Yeon-woo & Yoon Ji-min – Best New Artist & Song of the Year
 Park So-hyang & Choi Eun-kyeong – Artist of the Year

Winners and nominees

Main awards 
Winners and nominees are listed below. Winners are listed first and emphasized in bold.

Other awards

Gallery

Notes

References

External links 

 Official website

2010 music awards
Melon Music Awards ceremonies
Annual events in South Korea